General elections were held in Uruguay on 28 March 1938. The result was a victory for the Colorado Party, which won a majority of seats in the Chamber of Deputies and received the most votes in the presidential election, in which the Alfredo Baldomir faction emerged as the largest. Baldomir subsequently became President on 19 June.

This was the first time that Uruguayan women exerted their right to vote in a national election.

Results

President

Chamber of Deputies

Senate

References

Elections in Uruguay
Uruguay
General
Uruguay
Election and referendum articles with incomplete results